Martin Townsend may refer to:

 Martin I. Townsend (1810–1903), lawyer and politician from New York
 Martin Townsend (journalist) (born 1960), editor of the Sunday Express
 Martin G. Townsend, American bishop